An election for the National Assembly was held in Ogun State, Nigeria on Saturday, 22 February 2019.

Results
The results of the elections were announced by Prof. Idowu Olayinka of University of Ibadan. Released on 24 February 2019, the All Progressives Congress emerged victorious over the Peoples Democratic Party, winning most seats.

Senate

Ogun East Senate district

Ogun West Senate district

Ogun Central Senate district

House of Representatives

As of 15 March 2019, elected members were:

Keys:

See also
2019 Nigerian general election

References

2019 Nigerian general election
2019 Ogun State elections